Heritage Cablevision was the dominant cable-television provider in the Des Moines, Iowa, metro area during the 1980s. It was purchased by Tele-Communications Inc. in 1987. Heritage was founded in 1971 by James S. Cownie and was at one time the 9th-largest cable television service in the United States. Areas once served by Heritage Cablevision are now served by Mediacom.

References

Cable television companies of the United States
Companies based in Iowa